Poliaenus is a genus of longhorn beetles of the subfamily Lamiinae, containing the following species:

 Poliaenus abietis Tyson, 1968
 Poliaenus batesi Linsley, 1933
 Poliaenus californicus (Schaeffer, 1908)
 Poliaenus concolor (Schaeffer, 1909)
 Poliaenus hesperus Chemsak & Linsley, 1988
 Poliaenus negundo (Schaeffer, 1905)
 Poliaenus nuevoleonis Chemsak & Linsley, 1975
 Poliaenus obscurus (Fall, 1910)
 Poliaenus oregonus (LeConte, 1861)
 Poliaenus sparsus Chemsak & Linsley, 1975
 Poliaenus volitans (LeConte, 1873)

References

Pogonocherini